Ethyl diazoacetate (N=N=CHC(O)OC2H5) is a diazo compound and a reagent in organic chemistry. It was discovered by Theodor Curtius in 1883. The compound can be prepared by reaction of the ethyl ester of glycine with sodium nitrite and sodium acetate in water.

As a carbene precursor, it is used in the cyclopropanation of alkenes.

Although the compound is hazardous, it is used in chemical industry as a precursor to trovafloxacin. Procedures for safe industrial handling have been published.

Another location where EDA was used is in the production of BI-4752, a recently invented 5-HT2C agonist that is even superior to lorcaserin.

References 

Diazo compounds
Reagents for organic chemistry
Ethyl esters
Conjugated ketones